The third season of the American drama television series La Reina del Sur takes place four years after the events of the second season. The season is written by Lina Uribe and Darío Vanegas and directed by Carlos Bolado, Carlos Villegas and Claudia Pedraza, with Marcos Santana serving as executive producer and showrunner.

The season was announced on 16 July 2020.

The season premiered on Telemundo on 18 October 2022.

Plot 
After four years in prison in the United States for the deaths of three DEA agents, Teresa Mendoza escapes but will have to face a world full of conspiracy, risking her life in order to clear her name and reunite with her daughter Sofía.

Cast

Main 
 Kate del Castillo as Teresa Mendoza
 Pêpê Rapazote as Pablo Landero
 Antonio Gil as Oleg Yosikov
 Isabella Sierra as Sofía Dantes
 Alejandro Calva as César Güemes "Batman"
 Cuca Escribano as Sheila
 Kika Edgar as Genoveva Alcalá
 Lincoln Palomeque as Faustino Sánchez Godoy
 Ed Trucco as Ernie Palmero
 Horacio Garcia Rojas as Charlie Velazquez
 Agata Clares as Paloma Aljarafe
 Emannuel Orenday as Danilo Márquez
 Beth Chamberlin as Jane Kosar
 Sofia Lama as Susana Guzmán
 Humberto Zurita as Epifanio Vargas

Recurring and guest stars 
 Tiago Correa as Jonathan Peres
 Daniel Martínez as Senator
 Carlos Valencia as Montaño
 Arturo Ríos as Delio Jurado
 Dmitry Anisimov as Anton Potapushin
 Sara Vidorreta as Rocío Aljarafe
 Denia Agalianou as Vanessa
 Anderley Palomino as Mateo Mena
 Eduardo Yáñez as Antonio Alcalá
 Noé Hernández as General Carlos Garrido
 Pedro Grossman as Rogelio Tejada
 Matias Novoa as Nacho Duarte
 Jorge Ortiz as Don Satur
 Cristian Mercado as Captain Fredy Rojas
 Ariel Vargas as Sierra
 Fernando Solórzano as Father Gonzalo Perea
 Jarlin Martínez as Officer Ruiz
 Carla Ortiz as Karen Chacón
 Jorge Hidalgo as Abel
 Victor Rebull as Fedor Yasikov
 Alejandra Lazcano as Lina
 Alina Lozano
 Susana Condori
 Alejandro Marañón as El Perro
 Marcelo Dos Santos as Lorenzo Mortati
 María Abadi as Julieta Brito
 Alejo Fernández as Lucho
 Fabio Di Tomaso as Samuel Graiver
 Guillermo Pfening as Gregorio
 José María Negri
 Rodrigo Palacios as Bernardo
 Mayella Lloclla as Ana del Castillo
 Mariano Bertolini as Hugo
 Beto Benites as Rubén
 Gerardo Zamora as Eloy
 Emanuel Soriano as Armando
 Favio Posca as Salvatorre
 Gon Spina as Luis Gallardo

Production

Development 
On 16 July 2020, Telemundo announced that it had renewed La Reina del Sur for a third season. Filming of the season began on 31 May 2021. The season was filmed for seven months in countries like Bolivia, Peru, Argentina and Colombia. Filming concluded on 20 December 2021.

Marketing 
To promote the new season, Telemundo began to show re-runs of the second season weekday afternoons beginning on 18 July 2022. On 21 April 2022, Telemundo released the first teaser for the season.

Episodes

References 

2022 American television seasons